Xie Chaojie is a male former table tennis player from China. From 1989 to 1993 he won several medals in singles, doubles, and team events in the Asian Table Tennis Championships, in the Table Tennis World Cup, and in the World Table Tennis Championships.

See also
 List of table tennis players

References

Chinese male table tennis players
Living people
Table tennis players from Guangxi
People from Nanning
Year of birth missing (living people)